Al-Khafsah, also spelled Khafsa, is a village located  east of Aleppo in northern Syria. In the 2004 census, it had a population of 5,393.
 
In June 2016, the village was under control of ISIL. On 8 September 2016, ISIL evacuated its headquarters in al-Bab and moved it to Al Khafsah with dozens of vehicles carrying militants and weapons. This came a day after Turkish-led rebel forces expressed their goal of capturing al-Bab. On the evening of 7 March 2017, Khafsa was captured by the Syrian Arab Army (SAA).

References

Populated places in Manbij District
Towns in Aleppo Governorate